In the context of software quality, defect criticality is a measure of the impact of a software defect. It is defined as the product of severity, likelihood, and class.

Defects are different from user stories, and therefore the priority (severity) should be calculated as follows.

Severity/impact

 0 - Affects critical data or functionality and leaves users with no workaround
 1 - Affects critical data or functionality and forces users to employ a workaround
 2 - Affects non-critical data or functionality and forces users to employ a workaround
 3 - Affects non-critical data or functionality and does not force users to employ a workaround
 4 - Affects aesthetics, professional look and feel, “quality” or “usability”

Likelihood/visibility

 1 - Seen by all or almost all users who use the application (>=95% of users)
 2 - Seen by more than 2/3 of the users who use the application (>67% and <95%)
 3 - Seen by about half the users who use the application (>33% and <66%)
 4 - Seen by about 1/3 or less of the users who use the application (>0% and <32%)

Class of defect

Class 0
 Stability, Reliability and Availability
 Security
 Legal (Liability, ADA, Copyright)
Testability
 Storage (data loss/corruption)

Class 1
 Performance and Efficiency (use of resources: memory, disk, CPU)
 Scalability

Class 2
 Functionality
 Logic or Calculation
 Compatibility
Interoperability

Class 3
 Usability
 Learn ability
 Readability
 Documentation
 Consistency
 Workflow (“feel”)

Class 4
 Typographic or grammatical
Aesthetics
 Appearance or Cosmetic

Assessing the criticality score
 0–2 = Critical
 3–9 = Major
 10–20 = Medium
 21–64 = Low

References

Software bugs
Software articles needing attention
Software development
Quality assurance